Europe does not comprise a unitary patent system. European patent law is instead characterized by the coexistence of national patent systems, and thus national patent offices, and a European patent system associated with the European Patent Convention (EPC), in the context of which the European Patent Office (EPO) grants European patents through a central prosecution procedure. Enforcement of European patents are conducted and decided at a national level, i.e. before national courts. The patent offices in Europe therefore include, on the one hand, the plurality of national patent offices and, on the other hand, the European Patent Office. See also European patent law.

See also
 Eurasian Patent Organization (EAPO) 
 International Patent Institute (defunct institute)
 Nordic Patent Institute (NPI)
 Unified Patent Court
 Unitary patent
 World Intellectual Property Organization (WIPO)

References

European patent law
Patent offices